Elliot Vernon Hill (born 9 November 1978) is a former English cricketer. Hill was a left-handed batsman who played primarily as a wicketkeeper. He was born in Birmingham, Warwickshire.

Hill represented the Middlesex Cricket Board in a single List A match against Berkshire in the 2001 Cheltenham & Gloucester Trophy. In his only List A match he scored an unbeaten 3 runs and behind the stumps he made a single stumping.

References

External links
Vernon Hill at Cricinfo

1978 births
Living people
Cricketers from Birmingham, West Midlands
English cricketers
Middlesex Cricket Board cricketers
English cricketers of the 21st century
Wicket-keepers